English Electric Part One is the seventh studio album by the English progressive rock band Big Big Train. It was released on 3 September 2012, by English Electric Recordings and GEP.

Track listing

Personnel
Nick D'Virgilio –  drums, backing vocals
Dave Gregory – electric guitar, voice of the court usher, banjo, mellotron
David Longdon –  lead vocals, flute, vibes, tambourine, banjo, accordion, melodica, keyboards, acoustic guitar, mandolin, birds and bees
Andy Poole – keyboards, acoustic guitar, mandolin, backing vocals, baritone bee
Gregory Spawton – bass guitar, electric guitar, slow moog, backing vocals, mandolin, acoustic guitar, keyboards
 Danny Manners - keyboards, piano, double bass

Guest musicians
 Abigail Trundle - cello
 Andy Tillison - organ, Moog, keyboards
 Ben Godfrey - cornet, trumpet, piccolo trumpet
 Daniel Steinhardt - electric guitar
 Dave Desmond - trombone
 Eleanor Gilchrist - violin
 Geraldine Berreen - violin
 Jan Jaap Langereis - recorders
 Jon Truscott - tuba
 John Storey - euphonium, trombone
 Lily Adams - backing vocals
 Martin Orford - backing vocals
 Rachel Hall - violin
 Sue Bowran - violin
 Teresa Whipple - viola
 Verity Joy - backing vocals
 Violet Adams - backing vocals

Cover
The photos on the cover and the booklet were made by Matt Sefton at Tanfield Railway, Co. Durham. Big Big Train saw a picture from him on Flickr, that Matt Sefton described: "English Electric: Side panel of a railway crane, Tanfield Railway sidings, County Durham. Great name for a band and an album cover - if it doesn't exist already, I'm claiming it!“ Gregory Spawton commented, "My band is working on an album called English Electric at the moment. We're prog / post rock. Great pictures, thanks for uploading them." So Matt Sefton and BBT had contact and sometimes later a dealing. The pictures in the booklet are from the flickr-album "Tanfield Railway, Co. Durham“ by Matt Sefton.

External links
 
 Liner Notes
 RadioShow: The European Perspective #161

References

Big Big Train albums
2012 albums